The 2018–19 SDHL Season was the 12th season of the Swedish Women's Hockey League. The season began in September 2018 and ended in February 2019. 

Luleå HF/MSSK were the regular season champions for the fourth season in a row, and defeated Linköping HC 3-2 in the playoff finals to be crowned playoff champions for the third time in the last four years. Göteborg HC and SDE Hockey finished at the bottom of the table, but were able to avoid relegation to Damettan in the playoffs to the SDHL.

League business

Partnerships 
Prior to the beginning of the season, German company Axelent announced that they would redirect their sponsorship of HV71 away from the Champions Hockey League and towards HV71's women's side, after the men's side failed to qualify for the CHL.

Broadcasting 
12 regular season games were broadcast live by C More.

Significant events

Pre-season 
From 30 August to 2 September, the Damcup Umeå exhibition tournament was held in Umeå, in northern Sweden, between Luleå HF/MSSK, Modo Hockey, Damettan team IF Björklöven, and the Japanese national team. Luleå were crowned winners of the tournament after winning all three of their games.

At the end of September, the first Champions Cup was held in New Jersey between Luleå and the Metropolitan Riveters, the reigning NWHL champions. Luleå won the cup with a 4-2 victory, although the Riveters were missing a number of players due to injuries.

Post-season 
On 31 March 2019, the Canadian Women's Hockey League announced that it was folding. In response, the league's players announced a strike movement titled ForTheGame, which led to the creation of the PWHPA. On 10 May, Kelty Apperson became the first ForTheGame player to sign a contract in Sweden, joining SDE Hockey.

In July 2019, it was announced that the 2019 4 Nations Cup was due to be held in Luleå. In September, the Cup was cancelled due to the uncertainty surrounding the Swedish players' strike as well as the events in North America.

Standings 
Each team played 36 regular season games, with three points being awarded for winning in regulation time, two points for winning in overtime or shootout, one point for losing in overtime or shootout, and zero points for losing in regulation time. At the end of the regular season, the team that finishes with the most points is crowned the league champion.

Regular season

Playoffs

See also 
 Women's ice hockey in Sweden

References

External links 
 League website
 Official season statistics from the Swedish Ice Hockey Association

SDHL
SDHL
Women's ice hockey competitions in Sweden
Swedish Women's Hockey League seasons